Step Lively, Jeeves! is a 1937 American comedy film directed by Eugene Forde, written by Frank Fenton and Lynn Root, and starring Arthur Treacher as P. G. Wodehouse's Jeeves alongside Patricia Ellis, Robert Kent, Alan Dinehart, George Givot and Helen Flint. The film was released on April 1, 1937, by 20th Century Fox.

The character of Jeeves' master, Bertie Wooster, does not appear. The film is not based on any Jeeves story, and portrays Jeeves as a naive bumbler (which is not how he is portrayed by Wodehouse in the novels and short stories about him.

Plot

Two swindlers con Jeeves (portrayed by Arthur Treacher), claiming he has a fortune waiting for him in America, and he meets some gangsters there.

Cast   
Arthur Treacher as Jeeves
Patricia Ellis as Patricia Westley
Robert Kent as Gerry Townsend
Alan Dinehart as Hon. Cedric B. Cromwell
George Givot as Prince Boris Caminov
Helen Flint as Babe
John Harrington as Barney Ross
George Cooper as Slug
Arthur Housman as Max
Max Wagner as Joey
Franklin Pangborn as Gaston
 Phyllis Barry as Mrs. Tremaine
 George Cowl as Inspector

References

External links 
 

1937 films
1930s English-language films
20th Century Fox films
American comedy films
1937 comedy films
Films based on works by P. G. Wodehouse
Films directed by Eugene Forde
American black-and-white films
Films scored by Samuel Kaylin
1930s American films